The Lothians was one of the eight electoral regions of the Scottish Parliament (Holyrood) from 1999 to 2011. Nine of the parliament's 73 first past the post constituencies were sub-divisions of the region and it elected seven of the 56 additional-member Members of the Scottish Parliament (MSPs). Thus it elected a total of 16 MSPs.

The Lothians region shared boundaries with the South of Scotland and Central Scotland regions, and was connected with the Mid Scotland and Fife region by bridges over the Firth of Forth.

As a result of the First Periodic Review of Scottish Parliament Boundaries it is largely replaced by the Lothian region.

Constituencies and council areas

The City of Edinburgh and the West Lothian council areas are entirely within the region. Most of the East Lothian council area is outside, covered by the East Lothian constituency, which is in the South of Scotland region. A western portion of the Midlothian council area is covered by the Tweeddale, Ettrick and Lauderdale constituency, within the South of Scotland region.

Council areas are as defined in 1996, and may be subject to change after the next Scottish Parliament election.

The constituencies were created in 1999 with the names and boundaries of Westminster constituencies, as existing in at that time. Scottish Westminster constituencies were mostly replaced with new constituencies in 2005.

In terms of first past the post constituencies the region includes:

Members of the Scottish Parliament
The table below displays the Members of the Scottish Parliament that were elected from the Lothians region between 1999 and 2011. From the 2011 election the Lothian region was used.

Constituency MSPs

Regional List MSPs
N.B. This table is for presentation purposes only

Election results

2007 Scottish Parliament election
In the 2007 Scottish Parliament election the region elected MSPs as follows:

 5 Labour MSPs (four constituency members and one additional member)
 5 Scottish National Party MSPs (two constituency members and three additional members)
 2 Liberal Democrat MSPs (two constituency members)
 2 Conservative MSPs (one constituency and one additional member)
 1 Scottish Green Party MSPs (additional members)
 1 Independent MSP (additional member)

Constituency results 
{| class=wikitable
!colspan=4 style=background-color:#f2f2f2|2007 Scottish Parliament election: Lothians
|-
! colspan=2 style="width: 200px"|Constituency
! style="width: 150px"|Elected member
! style="width: 300px"|Result

Additional member results
{| class=wikitable
!colspan=8 style=background-color:#f2f2f2|2007 Scottish Parliament election: Lothians
|-
! colspan="2" style="width: 150px"|Party
! Elected candidates
! style="width: 40px"|Seats
! style="width: 40px"|+/−
! style="width: 50px"|Votes
! style="width: 40px"|%
! style="width: 40px"|+/−%
|-
 
 
 
 
  
 
 
 
 
  
 
 
 
 
 
 
 
 
 
 
 
 
 

Changes:
 On 31 August 2007, Stefan Tymkewycz resigned to concentrate on being a City of Edinburgh councillor and was replaced by Shirley-Anne Somerville.

2003 Scottish Parliament election
In the 2003 Scottish Parliament election the region elected MSPs as follows:

 6 Labour MSPs (all constituency members)
 2 Liberal Democrat MSPs (two constituency members)
 2 Conservative MSPs (one constituency and one additional member)
 2 Scottish Green Party MSPs (both additional members)
 2 Scottish National Party MSPs (both additional members)
 1 Independent MSP (additional member)
 1 Scottish Socialist Party MSP (additional member)

Constituency results
{| class=wikitable
!colspan=4 style=background-color:#f2f2f2|2003 Scottish Parliament election: Lothians
|-
! colspan=2 style="width: 200px"|Constituency
! style="width: 150px"|Elected member
! style="width: 300px"|Result

Additional member results
{| class=wikitable
!colspan=8 style=background-color:#f2f2f2|2003 Scottish Parliament election: Lothians
|-
! colspan="2" style="width: 150px"|Party
! Elected candidates
! style="width: 40px"|Seats
! style="width: 40px"|+/−
! style="width: 50px"|Votes
! style="width: 40px"|%
! style="width: 40px"|+/−%
|-

1999 Scottish Parliament election
In the 1999 Scottish Parliament election the region elected MSPs as follows:

 8 Labour MSPs (all constituency members)
 3 Scottish National Party MSPs (all additional members)
 2 Liberal Democrat MSPs (one constituency member and one additional member)
 2 Conservative MSPs (both additional members)
 1 Green Party MSP (additional member)

Constituency results
{| class=wikitable
!colspan=4 style=background-color:#f2f2f2|1999 Scottish Parliament election: Lothians
|-
! colspan=2 style="width: 200px"|Constituency
! style="width: 150px"|Elected member
! style="width: 300px"|Result

Additional member results
{| class=wikitable
!colspan=8 style=background-color:#f2f2f2|1999 Scottish Parliament election: Lothians
|-
! colspan="2" style="width: 150px"|Party
! Elected candidates
! style="width: 40px"|Seats
! style="width: 40px"|+/−
! style="width: 50px"|Votes
! style="width: 40px"|%
! style="width: 40px"|+/−%
|-

Footnotes 

Politics of Midlothian
Scottish Parliament constituencies and regions 1999–2011
Lothian